Ohio State Route 523 (OH 523) is a state highway in North Central Ohio. A short connector route, OH 523 links OH 19 at its western terminus with OH 53 at its eastern terminus.

Route description 

OH 523 begins at an intersection with OH 19 and County Road 143 in Rice Township. The route heads eastward along a flat terrain, passing a couple of homes and then progressing through fields and nothing else around it. There is an intersection with Fangboner Road (Township Road 166) soon after, but there is no intersections with other state-maintained roads afterwards. County Road 170 comes soon after, crossing at about the midpoint of the highway.

As the road progresses eastward, there are intersections with county roads 174 and 182 and one township road.

History 
OH 523 was assigned to its current routing in 1939, and has not seen any changes of significance since its inception.

Junctions

References

External links

State Route 523 Endpoint Photos

523
Transportation in Sandusky County, Ohio